Gianmarco Bellini (born September 15, 1958)  is an Italian Air Force officer who served with U.N. Coalition forces and was a prisoner of war during the First Gulf War.

Career
Bellini enlisted in the Italian Air Force in 1977 and attended the Italian Accademia Aeronautica (Air Force Academy). He was then trained as a pilot at Laughlin Air Force Base in the United States. He has a degree in political science from the Federico II University in Naples,  and a master's degree in strategic studies from the Air War College at Air University, based at Maxwell Air Force Base in Alabama, United States.

Gulf War
On the eve of the Operation Desert Storm the Italian government deployed eight Tornado Fighter-bombers on the Gulf Theatre of Operations. On January 16, 1991, coalition forces began concentrated air strikes on Iraqi military targets in Iraq and Kuwait.

On January 18, 1991, an Italian Tornado piloted by Major Gianmarco Bellini with Captain Maurizio Cocciolone as his navigator took off as part of a multi national 48 planes squadron. Bellini and Cocciolone were the only members of the flight able to execute in-flight refueling, while the other 47 aircraft failed and had to abort the mission. The mission profile dictated that the operation could be performed even by a single plane, so Bellini and Cocciolone went on. Their plane was hit by Iraqi anti aircraft fire and they had to eject. They were captured by the Iraqi Republican Guard, even though their status was unknown at the time.

While Cocciolone was shown on Iraqi television on January 20, 1991, in a propaganda video,  no news of Bellini was given initially, and he was feared to be a casualty. The two were kept separate for the whole time of their captivity. On March 3, 1991, both officers were released.  Bellini holds numerous military decorations including the silver Medal for Military Valor for his actions during the Operation Desert Storm.

Bellini and Cocciolone were the only Italian Prisoners of War of the entire war.

Later career
Bellini was appointed commanding officer of the Ghedi air base in 2001.

References

External links
 Gianmarco Bellini recounts his history 

Living people
1958 births
Italian Air Force personnel
Italian aviators
Gulf War prisoners of war
Military personnel of the Gulf War
Italian prisoners of war
Shot-down aviators
Prisoners of war held by Iraq